Sigatica semisulcata is a species of predatory sea snail, a marine gastropod mollusk in the family Naticidae, the moon snails.

Distribution

Description 
The maximum recorded shell length is 15 mm.

Habitat 
Minimum recorded depth is 0 m. Maximum recorded depth is 60 m.

References

External links

Naticidae
Gastropods described in 1839
Taxa named by John Edward Gray